The Health Services functional constituency, formerly called the Health Care, was a functional constituency in the elections for the Legislative Council of Hong Kong first created for the 1988 Legislative Council election. The constituency is composed of health services related professionals with one of the larger number of electorates among the functional constituencies. It was a stronghold of the pro-democracy camp, holding the seat since its creation. It was merged with Medical into Medical and Health Services functional constituency in the major electoral overhaul in 2021.

Composition
The Health Services functional constituency is composed of chiropractors, nurses, midwives, pharmacists, medical laboratory technologists, radiographers, physiotherapists, occupational therapists, optometrists, dental hygienists, audiologists, audiology technicians, chiropodists, dental surgery assistants, dental technicians, dental technologists, dental therapists, dietitians, dispensers, mould laboratory technicians, orthoptists, clinical psychologists, educational psychologists, prosthetists, speech therapists and scientific officers.

Return Members

Health Care (1988–1995)

Health Services (1995–2021)

Electoral results

2010s

2000s

1990s

1980s

References

Constituencies of Hong Kong
Constituencies of Hong Kong Legislative Council
Functional constituencies (Hong Kong)
1998 establishments in Hong Kong
Constituencies established in 1998
2021 disestablishments in Hong Kong
Constituencies disestablished in 2021